Saint-Hyacinthe—Bagot (formerly known as Saint-Hyacinthe and St. Hyacinthe—Bagot) is a federal electoral district that has been represented in the House of Commons of Canada since 1935. It is located in Quebec, Canada. Its population in 2006 was 95,983. In the 2015 election, the winner received the lowest vote percentage of any winning candidate in the country.

Geography
The district includes the Regional County Municipalities of Acton and Les Maskoutains. It includes the communities of Saint-Hyacinthe, Acton Vale, Saint-Pie, Sainte-Madeleine, and Saint-Dominique.

Political geography
Almost all of the riding voted for the Bloc in 2006 except for parts of Roxton Falls and its surrounding township, Roxton which voted Conservative.

History
The electoral district was created in 1933 as "St. Hyacinthe—Bagot". In 1947, the name was changed to "Saint-Hyacinthe—Bagot".

In 1966, the riding was abolished. Parts of the riding were combined with parts of Chambly—Rouville and Richelieu—Verchères riding into a new riding named "Saint-Hyacinthe". Saint-Hyacinthe was renamed "Saint-Hyacinthe—Bagot" after the 1980 election.

This riding was not changed as a result of the 2012 electoral redistribution.

2007 by-election

After the resignation of Yvan Loubier on 21 February 2007, a by-election occurred on 17 September 2007.

Members of Parliament

This riding has elected the following Members of Parliament:

Election results

Saint-Hyacinthe—Bagot, 1981-present

Note: Conservative vote is compared to the total of the Canadian Alliance vote and Progressive Conservative vote in 2000 election.

Saint-Hyacinthe, 1966-1980

					

					
						

Note: Social Credit vote is compared to Ralliement créditiste vote in the 1968 election.

Saint-Hyacinthe—Bagot, 1947-1966

Note: Ralliement créditiste vote is compared to Social Credit vote in the 1963 election.

					

					

Note: Union des Electeurs popular vote is compared to Social Credit vote in 1945 general election.

St. Hyacinthe—Bagot, 1933-1947

See also
 List of Canadian federal electoral districts
 Past Canadian electoral districts

References

Campaign expense data from Elections Canada
Riding history from the Library of Parliament 

2011 Results from Elections Canada

Notes

Quebec federal electoral districts
Saint-Hyacinthe
Les Maskoutains Regional County Municipality
Acton Regional County Municipality